Data storage is the recording (storing) of information (data) in a storage medium. Handwriting, phonographic recording, magnetic tape, and optical discs are all examples of storage media. Biological molecules such as RNA and DNA are considered by some as data storage. Recording may be accomplished with virtually any form of energy. Electronic data storage requires electrical power to store and retrieve data. 

Data storage in a digital, machine-readable medium is sometimes called digital data. Computer data storage is one of the core functions of a general-purpose computer. Electronic documents can be stored in much less space than paper documents. Barcodes and magnetic ink character recognition (MICR) are two ways of recording machine-readable data on paper.

Recording media
A recording medium is a physical material that holds information. Newly created information is distributed and can be stored in four storage media–print, film, magnetic, and optical–and seen or heard in four information flows–telephone, radio and TV, and the Internet as well as being observed directly.  Digital information is stored on electronic media in many different recording formats.

With electronic media, the data and the recording media are sometimes referred to as "software" despite the more common use of the word to describe computer software. With (traditional art) static media, art materials such as crayons may be considered both equipment and medium as the wax, charcoal or chalk material from the equipment becomes part of the surface of the medium.

Some recording media may be temporary either by design or by nature. Volatile organic compounds may be used to preserve the environment or to purposely make data expire over time.  Data such as smoke signals or skywriting are temporary by nature. Depending on the volatility, a gas (e.g. atmosphere, smoke) or a liquid surface such as a lake would be considered a temporary recording medium if at all.

Global capacity, digitization, and trends
A 2003 UC Berkeley report estimated that about five exabytes of new information were produced in 2002 and that 92% of this data was stored on hard disk drives. This was about twice the data produced in 2000.  The amount of data transmitted over telecommunication systems in 2002 was nearly 18 exabytes—three and a half times more than was recorded on non-volatile storage. Telephone calls constituted 98% of the telecommunicated information in 2002. The researchers' highest estimate for the growth rate of newly stored information (uncompressed) was more than 30% per year.

A 2011 Science (journal) article estimated that the year 2002 was the beginning of the digital age for information storage: an age in which more information is stored on digital storage devices than on analog storage devices. In 1986, approximately 1% of the world's capacity to store information was in digital format; this grew to 3% by 1993, to 25% by 2000, and to 97% by 2007. These figures correspond to less than three compressed exabytes in 1986, and 295 compressed exabytes in 2007. The quantity of digital storage doubled roughly every three years.

In a more limited study, the International Data Corporation estimated that the total amount of digital data in 2007 was 281 exabytes, and that the total amount of digital data produced exceeded the global storage capacity for the first time.

See also

References

Further reading
 
 History of Computer Data Storage 
 History of Storage from Cave Paintings to Electrons
 The Evolution of Data Storage

 
Data management
Film and video technology
Mass media technology
Recording
Sound production technology